Tony Charles Middleton (born 1 February 1964) is a former English first-class cricketer. He played for Hampshire making his debut in 1984. He played in two winning one day finals in 1991 and 1992. His best season was in 1992 when he scored 1780 runs at an average of almost 50, including 6 centuries. He was named their Cricket Society's Player of the Year in 1992 and chosen for that winter's England "A" tour to Australia.

Middleton joint top-scored with Robin Smith for Hampshire in the final of the 1991 NatWest Trophy, making 78 as Hampshire narrowly beat Surrey.

He retired in 1995 and since then has been in coaching roles with Hampshire County Cricket Club and is currently their batting coach. His son Fletcha Middleton is a young cricketer playing at Hampshire.

References

1964 births
Living people
English cricketers
Hampshire cricketers
Cricketers from Winchester
Hampshire Cricket Board cricketers